This is the list of 355 isomers of dodecane.

Straight chain
Dodecane

Undecane
2-Methylundecane
3-Methylundecane
4-Methylundecane
5-Methylundecane
6-Methylundecane

Decane

Dimethyl

2,2-Dimethyldecane
2,3-Dimethyldecane
2,4-Dimethyldecane
2,5-Dimethyldecane
2,6-Dimethyldecane
2,7-Dimethyldecane
2,8-Dimethyldecane
2,9-Dimethyldecane
3,3-Dimethyldecane
3,4-Dimethyldecane
3,5-Dimethyldecane
3,6-Dimethyldecane
3,7-Dimethyldecane
3,8-Dimethyldecane
4,4-Dimethyldecane
4,5-Dimethyldecane
4,6-Dimethyldecane
4,7-Dimethyldecane
5,5-Dimethyldecane
5,6-Dimethyldecane

Ethyl
3-Ethyldecane
4-Ethyldecane
5-Ethyldecane

Nonane

Trimethyl

2,2,3-Trimethylnonane
2,2,4-Trimethylnonane
2,2,5-Trimethylnonane
2,2,6-Trimethylnonane
2,2,7-Trimethylnonane
2,2,8-Trimethylnonane
2,3,3-Trimethylnonane
2,3,4-Trimethylnonane
2,3,5-Trimethylnonane
2,3,6-Trimethylnonane
2,3,7-Trimethylnonane
2,3,8-Trimethylnonane
2,4,4-Trimethylnonane
2,4,5-Trimethylnonane
2,4,6-Trimethylnonane
2,4,7-Trimethylnonane
2,4,8-Trimethylnonane
2,5,5-Trimethylnonane
2,5,6-Trimethylnonane
2,5,7-Trimethylnonane
2,5,8-Trimethylnonane
2,6,6-Trimethylnonane
2,6,7-Trimethylnonane
2,7,7-Trimethylnonane
3,3,4-Trimethylnonane
3,3,5-Trimethylnonane
3,3,6-Trimethylnonane
3,3,7-Trimethylnonane
3,4,4-Trimethylnonane
3,4,5-Trimethylnonane
3,4,6-Trimethylnonane
3,4,7-Trimethylnonane
3,5,5-Trimethylnonane
3,5,6-Trimethylnonane
3,5,7-Trimethylnonane
3,6,6-Trimethylnonane
4,4,5-Trimethylnonane
4,4,6-Trimethylnonane
4,5,5-Trimethylnonane
4,5,6-Trimethylnonane

Ethyl+Methyl

3-Ethyl-2-methylnonane
3-Ethyl-3-methylnonane
3-Ethyl-4-methylnonane
3-Ethyl-5-methylnonane
3-Ethyl-6-methylnonane
3-Ethyl-7-methylnonane
4-Ethyl-2-methylnonane
4-Ethyl-3-methylnonane
4-Ethyl-4-methylnonane
4-Ethyl-5-methylnonane
4-Ethyl-6-methylnonane
5-Ethyl-2-methylnonane
5-Ethyl-3-methylnonane
5-Ethyl-4-methylnonane
5-Ethyl-5-methylnonane
6-Ethyl-2-methylnonane
6-Ethyl-3-methylnonane
7-Ethyl-2-methylnonane

Propyl
4-Propylnonane
5-Propylnonane
4-(1-Methylethyl)nonane
5-(1-Methylethyl)nonane

Octane

Tetramethyl

2,2,3,3-Tetramethyloctane
2,2,3,4-Tetramethyloctane
2,2,3,5-Tetramethyloctane
2,2,3,6-Tetramethyloctane
2,2,3,7-Tetramethyloctane
2,2,4,4-Tetramethyloctane
2,2,4,5-Tetramethyloctane
2,2,4,6-Tetramethyloctane
2,2,4,7-Tetramethyloctane
2,2,5,5-Tetramethyloctane
2,2,5,6-Tetramethyloctane
2,2,5,7-Tetramethyloctane
2,2,6,6-Tetramethyloctane
2,2,6,7-Tetramethyloctane
2,2,7,7-Tetramethyloctane
2,3,3,4-Tetramethyloctane
2,3,3,5-Tetramethyloctane
2,3,3,6-Tetramethyloctane
2,3,3,7-Tetramethyloctane
2,3,4,4-Tetramethyloctane
2,3,4,5-Tetramethyloctane
2,3,4,6-Tetramethyloctane
2,3,4,7-Tetramethyloctane
2,3,5,5-Tetramethyloctane
2,3,5,6-Tetramethyloctane
2,3,5,7-Tetramethyloctane
2,3,6,6-Tetramethyloctane
2,3,6,7-Tetramethyloctane
2,4,4,5-Tetramethyloctane
2,4,4,6-Tetramethyloctane
2,4,4,7-Tetramethyloctane
2,4,5,5-Tetramethyloctane
2,4,5,6-Tetramethyloctane
2,4,5,7-Tetramethyloctane
2,4,6,6-Tetramethyloctane
2,5,5,6-Tetramethyloctane
2,5,6,6-Tetramethyloctane
3,3,4,4-Tetramethyloctane
3,3,4,5-Tetramethyloctane
3,3,4,6-Tetramethyloctane
3,3,5,5-Tetramethyloctane
3,3,5,6-Tetramethyloctane
3,3,6,6-Tetramethyloctane
3,4,4,5-Tetramethyloctane
3,4,4,6-Tetramethyloctane
3,4,5,5-Tetramethyloctane
3,4,5,6-Tetramethyloctane
4,4,5,5-Tetramethyloctane

Ethyl+Dimethyl

3-Ethyl-2,2-dimethyloctane
3-Ethyl-2,3-dimethyloctane
3-Ethyl-2,4-dimethyloctane
3-Ethyl-2,5-dimethyloctane
3-Ethyl-2,6-dimethyloctane
3-Ethyl-2,7-dimethyloctane
3-Ethyl-3,4-dimethyloctane
3-Ethyl-3,5-dimethyloctane
3-Ethyl-3,6-dimethyloctane
3-Ethyl-4,4-dimethyloctane
3-Ethyl-4,5-dimethyloctane
3-Ethyl-4,6-dimethyloctane
3-Ethyl-5,5-dimethyloctane
4-Ethyl-2,2-dimethyloctane
4-Ethyl-2,3-dimethyloctane
4-Ethyl-2,4-dimethyloctane
4-Ethyl-2,5-dimethyloctane
4-Ethyl-2,6-dimethyloctane
4-Ethyl-2,7-dimethyloctane
4-Ethyl-3,3-dimethyloctane
4-Ethyl-3,4-dimethyloctane
4-Ethyl-3,5-dimethyloctane
4-Ethyl-3,6-dimethyloctane
4-Ethyl-4,5-dimethyloctane
5-Ethyl-2,2-dimethyloctane
5-Ethyl-2,3-dimethyloctane
5-Ethyl-2,4-dimethyloctane
5-Ethyl-2,5-dimethyloctane
5-Ethyl-2,6-dimethyloctane
5-Ethyl-3,3-dimethyloctane
5-Ethyl-3,4-dimethyloctane
5-Ethyl-3,5-dimethyloctane
5-Ethyl-4,4-dimethyloctane
6-Ethyl-2,2-dimethyloctane
6-Ethyl-2,3-dimethyloctane
6-Ethyl-2,4-dimethyloctane
6-Ethyl-2,5-dimethyloctane
6-Ethyl-2,6-dimethyloctane
6-Ethyl-3,3-dimethyloctane
6-Ethyl-3,4-dimethyloctane

Diethyl

3,3-Diethyloctane
3,4-Diethyloctane
3,5-Diethyloctane
3,6-Diethyloctane
4,4-Diethyloctane
4,5-Diethyloctane

Methyl+Propyl

2-Methyl-4-propyloctane
3-Methyl-4-propyloctane
4-Methyl-4-propyloctane
4-Methyl-5-propyloctane
2-Methyl-5-propyloctane
3-Methyl-5-propyloctane
2-Methyl-3-(1-methylethyl)octane
2-Methyl-4-(1-methylethyl)octane
3-Methyl-4-(1-methylethyl)octane
4-Methyl-4-(1-methylethyl)octane
4-Methyl-5-(1-methylethyl)octane
2-Methyl-5-(1-methylethyl)octane
3-Methyl-5-(1-methylethyl)octane

tert-Butyl
4-(1,1-Dimethylethyl)octane or 4-tert-Butyloctane

Heptane

Pentamethyl

2,2,3,3,4-Pentamethylheptane
2,2,3,3,5-Pentamethylheptane
2,2,3,3,6-Pentamethylheptane
2,2,3,4,4-Pentamethylheptane
2,2,3,4,5-Pentamethylheptane
2,2,3,4,6-Pentamethylheptane
2,2,3,5,5-Pentamethylheptane
2,2,3,5,6-Pentamethylheptane
2,2,3,6,6-Pentamethylheptane
2,2,4,4,5-Pentamethylheptane
2,2,4,4,6-Pentamethylheptane
2,2,4,5,5-Pentamethylheptane
2,2,4,5,6-Pentamethylheptane
2,2,4,6,6-Pentamethylheptane
2,2,5,5,6-Pentamethylheptane
2,3,3,4,4-Pentamethylheptane
2,3,3,4,5-Pentamethylheptane
2,3,3,4,6-Pentamethylheptane
2,3,3,5,5-Pentamethylheptane
2,3,3,5,6-Pentamethylheptane
2,3,4,4,5-Pentamethylheptane
2,3,4,4,6-Pentamethylheptane
2,3,4,5,5-Pentamethylheptane
2,3,4,5,6-Pentamethylheptane
2,4,4,5,5-Pentamethylheptane
3,3,4,4,5-Pentamethylheptane
3,3,4,5,5-Pentamethylheptane

Ethyl+Trimethyl

3-Ethyl-2,2,3-trimethylheptane
3-Ethyl-2,2,4-trimethylheptane
3-Ethyl-2,2,5-trimethylheptane
3-Ethyl-2,2,6-trimethylheptane
3-Ethyl-2,3,4-trimethylheptane
3-Ethyl-2,3,5-trimethylheptane
3-Ethyl-2,3,6-trimethylheptane
3-Ethyl-2,4,4-trimethylheptane
3-Ethyl-2,4,5-trimethylheptane
3-Ethyl-2,4,6-trimethylheptane
3-Ethyl-2,5,5-trimethylheptane
3-Ethyl-2,5,6-trimethylheptane
3-Ethyl-3,4,4-trimethylheptane
3-Ethyl-3,4,5-trimethylheptane
3-Ethyl-3,5,5-trimethylheptane
3-Ethyl-4,4,5-trimethylheptane
4-Ethyl-2,2,3-trimethylheptane
4-Ethyl-2,2,4-trimethylheptane
4-Ethyl-2,2,5-trimethylheptane
4-Ethyl-2,2,6-trimethylheptane
4-Ethyl-2,3,3-trimethylheptane
4-Ethyl-2,3,4-trimethylheptane
4-Ethyl-2,3,5-trimethylheptane
4-Ethyl-2,3,6-trimethylheptane
4-Ethyl-2,4,5-trimethylheptane
4-Ethyl-2,4,6-trimethylheptane
4-Ethyl-2,5,5-trimethylheptane
4-Ethyl-3,3,4-trimethylheptane
4-Ethyl-3,3,5-trimethylheptane
4-Ethyl-3,4,5-trimethylheptane
5-Ethyl-2,2,3-trimethylheptane
5-Ethyl-2,2,4-trimethylheptane
5-Ethyl-2,2,5-trimethylheptane
5-Ethyl-2,2,6-trimethylheptane
5-Ethyl-2,3,3-trimethylheptane
5-Ethyl-2,3,4-trimethylheptane
5-Ethyl-2,3,5-trimethylheptane
5-Ethyl-2,4,4-trimethylheptane
5-Ethyl-2,4,5-trimethylheptane
5-Ethyl-3,3,4-trimethylheptane

Diethyl+Methyl

3,3-Diethyl-2-methylheptane
3,3-Diethyl-4-methylheptane
3,3-Diethyl-5-methylheptane
3,4-Diethyl-2-methylheptane
3,4-Diethyl-3-methylheptane
3,4-Diethyl-4-methylheptane
3,4-Diethyl-5-methylheptane
3,5-Diethyl-2-methylheptane
3,5-Diethyl-3-methylheptane
3,5-Diethyl-4-methylheptane
4,4-Diethyl-2-methylheptane
4,4-Diethyl-3-methylheptane
4,5-Diethyl-2-methylheptane
5,5-Diethyl-2-methylheptane

Dimethyl+Propyl

2,2-Dimethyl-4-propylheptane
2,3-Dimethyl-4-propylheptane
2,4-Dimethyl-4-propylheptane
2,5-Dimethyl-4-propylheptane
2,6-Dimethyl-4-propylheptane
3,3-Dimethyl-4-propylheptane
3,4-Dimethyl-4-propylheptane
3,5-Dimethyl-4-propylheptane
2,2-Dimethyl-3-(1-methylethyl)heptane
2,3-Dimethyl-3-(1-methylethyl)heptane
2,4-Dimethyl-3-(1-methylethyl)heptane
2,5-Dimethyl-3-(1-methylethyl)heptane
2,6-Dimethyl-3-(1-methylethyl)heptane
2,2-Dimethyl-4-(1-methylethyl)heptane
2,3-Dimethyl-4-(1-methylethyl)heptane
2,4-Dimethyl-4-(1-methylethyl)heptane
2,5-Dimethyl-4-(1-methylethyl)heptane
2,6-Dimethyl-4-(1-methylethyl)heptane
3,3-Dimethyl-4-(1-methylethyl)heptane
3,4-Dimethyl-4-(1-methylethyl)heptane
3,5-Dimethyl-4-(1-methylethyl)heptane

Ethyl+Propyl
3-Ethyl-4-propylheptane
4-Ethyl-4-propylheptane
3-Ethyl-4-(1-methylethyl)heptane
4-Ethyl-4-(1-methylethyl)heptane

Propyl+Methyl
4-(1,1-Dimethylethyl)-2-methylheptane
4-(1,1-Dimethylethyl)-3-methylheptane
4-(1,1-Dimethylethyl)-4-methylheptane

Hexane

Hexamethyl

2,2,3,3,4,4-Hexamethylhexane
2,2,3,3,4,5-Hexamethylhexane
2,2,3,3,5,5-Hexamethylhexane
2,2,3,4,4,5-Hexamethylhexane
2,2,3,4,5,5-Hexamethylhexane
2,3,3,4,4,5-Hexamethylhexane

Ethyl+Tetramethyl

3-Ethyl-2,2,3,4-tetramethylhexane
3-Ethyl-2,2,3,5-tetramethylhexane
3-Ethyl-2,2,4,4-tetramethylhexane
3-Ethyl-2,2,4,5-tetramethylhexane
3-Ethyl-2,2,5,5-tetramethylhexane
3-Ethyl-2,3,4,4-tetramethylhexane
3-Ethyl-2,3,4,5-tetramethylhexane
4-Ethyl-2,2,3,3-tetramethylhexane
4-Ethyl-2,2,3,4-tetramethylhexane
4-Ethyl-2,2,3,5-tetramethylhexane
4-Ethyl-2,2,4,5-tetramethylhexane
4-Ethyl-2,3,3,4-tetramethylhexane
4-Ethyl-2,3,3,5-tetramethylhexane

Diethyl+Dimethyl

3,3-Diethyl-2,2-dimethylhexane
3,3-Diethyl-2,4-dimethylhexane
3,3-Diethyl-2,5-dimethylhexane
3,3-Diethyl-4,4-dimethylhexane
3,4-Diethyl-2,2-dimethylhexane
3,4-Diethyl-2,3-dimethylhexane
3,4-Diethyl-2,4-dimethylhexane
3,4-Diethyl-2,5-dimethylhexane
3,4-Diethyl-3,4-dimethylhexane
4,4-Diethyl-2,2-dimethylhexane
4,4-Diethyl-2,3-dimethylhexane

Triethyl
3,3,4-Triethylhexane

Trimethyl+Propyl

2,2,3-Trimethyl-3-(1-methylethyl)hexane
2,2,4-Trimethyl-3-(1-methylethyl)hexane
2,2,5-Trimethyl-3-(1-methylethyl)hexane
2,3,4-Trimethyl-3-(1-methylethyl)hexane
2,3,5-Trimethyl-3-(1-methylethyl)hexane
2,4,4-Trimethyl-3-(1-methylethyl)hexane
2,3,5-Trimethyl-4-(1-methylethyl)hexane
2,2,5-Trimethyl-4-(1-methylethyl)hexane

Ethyl+Methyl+Propyl
3-Ethyl-2-methyl-3-(1-methylethyl)hexane
4-Ethyl-2-methyl-3-(1-methylethyl)hexane

tert-Butyl+Dimethyl
3-(1,1-Dimethylethyl)-2,2-dimethylhexane

Pentane

Ethyl+Pentamethyl
3-Ethyl-2,2,3,4,4-pentamethylpentane

Diethyl+Trimethyl
3,3-Diethyl-2,2,4-trimethylpentane

Tetramethyl+Propyl
2,2,3,4-Tetramethyl-3-(1-methylethyl)pentane
2,2,4,4-Tetramethyl-3-(1-methylethyl)pentane

Ethyl+Dimethyl+Propyl
3-Ethyl-2,4-dimethyl-3-(1-methylethyl)pentane

References 

Lists of isomers of alkanes
Hydrocarbons